The Yarmook-class corvette is a class of corvettes in service with the Pakistan Navy. The class is primarily based on Damen Group's Offshore Patrol Vessel (OPV) 1900. The primary role of the class is to patrol the sea area.

History 
Damen signed an agreement with Ministry of Defence Production, Pakistan on 30 June 2017 to design and build two multipurpose corvettes for Pakistan Navy. The Dutch shipbuilder selected its shipyard in Galați, Romania to build these vessels. According to Pakistan Navy officials, the corvettes will "act as force multipliers in enhancing [the] navy's capability of safeguarding maritime frontiers and will offer more flexibility in the conduct of [the] Pakistan Navy's initiative of independent Regional Maritime Security Patrols in the Indian Ocean Region". On 13 July 2020, PNS Yarmook was inducted into the Pakistan Navy.

Design and characteristics 
The displacement of both the vessels is 2300 tonnes. They are designed to carry out a variety of maritime operations and are able to transport both a helicopter and a UAV. They can also carry two high-speed rigid-hulled inflatable boats of 11.5 meters and 6.5 meters simultaneously. In addition to that, they are designed to accommodate two twenty-foot equivalent units (TEUs) for special mission-based operations.

Ships in class 
There are two Yarmook-class corvettes in Pakistan Navy service:

References 

Ships of the Pakistan Navy
Corvettes
Damen Group